National Airlines Flight 470 was a regularly scheduled flight between Tampa and New Orleans that crashed on February 14, 1953 after encountering severe turbulence. The crash marked the deadliest accident in the history of National Airlines, killing 46 (5 crew and 41 passengers), among them the widow of the cartoonist Billy DeBeck: Mary Bergman.

Events
The USCGC Blackthorn assisted in search and recovery operations. National Airlines did not maintain its own meteorology department, as was standard among airlines at the time, and its pilots were not informed of the strength of the storm into which they were flying.

References

External links
 Report of the Civil Aeronautics Board - PDF

470
Accidents and incidents involving the Douglas DC-6
Aviation accidents and incidents in the United States in 1953
Aviation accidents and incidents in Alabama
1953 in Alabama